María Paula Coto González (born 2 March 1998) is a Costa Rican footballer who plays as a defender for Liga Deportiva Alajuelense Femenino and the Costa Rica women's national team.

Club career
Coto played for C.S. Herediano Femenino in Costa Rica.

International career
Coto was part of the Costa Rican team at the 2015 FIFA Women's World Cup.

References

External links
 

1998 births
Living people
Costa Rican women's footballers
Costa Rica women's international footballers
Place of birth missing (living people)
2015 FIFA Women's World Cup players
Women's association football defenders
Central American Games gold medalists for Costa Rica
Central American Games medalists in football